Meghna Pant is an Indian author, journalist and speaker. She has won a variety of awards for her contribution to literature, gender issues and journalism. In 2012, she won the Muse India National Literary Awards Young Writer Award for her debut novel One-and-a-Half Wife.  Her collection of short stories, Happy Birthday and Other Stories was long-listed for the Frank O’Connor International Award.

Career
Pant previously worked as a business news anchor with Times Now, NDTV and Bloomberg-UTV in Mumbai and New York City. She reported from the New York Stock Exchange (NYSE) during the 2008 financial crisis. She quit in 2013 to pursue writing full-time, and returned to India.

Her debut novel One & a Half Wife (Westland, 2012) won the national Muse India Young Writer Award (2014) and was shortlisted for the Amazon Breakthrough Novel Award.

Pant's debut collection of short stories Happy Birthday (Random House, 2013) was long-listed for the Frank O'Connor International Award (2014). Her second short story collection The Trouble With Women was published in 2016.

In 2015, she began curating a monthly panel discussion in Mumbai called "Feminist Rani", featuring interviews with a wide range of Indian feminists. After three years of the discussions, she published a collection of the interviews in her first non-fiction book Feminist Rani in 2018, co-authored with Shaili Chopra. Her second non-fiction book was How To Get Published in India in 2019, based on interviews with publishing industry insiders and authors.

Pant has written on issues including consent, rape, domestic violence, miscarriage, surrogacy, body-shaming and public safety for women for various publications, including The Hindustan Times and The Huffington Post, and was the Features Editor at SheThePeople.TV. In 2018, she was awarded the Laadli Media Award for her writing on gender equality.

As a survivor of domestic violence, she has also spoken on several platforms, including TEDx, on her personal experience, urging women to speak out against domestic violence. She has also spoken at literary festivals and conferences, including the Jaipur Literature Festival, Tata Literature Live!, Kala Ghoda Literature Festival, Pune International Literary Festival, Young Makers Conclave, #RiseWithTwitter, and The UN Feminist Conference. In 2018, Pant moderated panel discussions at the #MeToo Conversations event hosted by Firstpost.

Pant's short stories have been published in Avatar Review, Wasafari, Eclectica, and QLRS, and her story "Boonthing" was published in the anthology The Himalayan Arc: Journeys East of South-east.

She also anchors various women-centric shows for the news portal FirstPost.

In 2019, Pant appeared as an expert on the show Kaun Banega Crorepati with Amitabh Bachchan.

In 2020, Pant became a podcaster with a show about personal finance called SHOW ME THE MONEY, for Amazon's Audible.

Critical reception
According to Michelle D'Souza of the Khaleej Times, her "works come with strong feminist leanings, and showcase multi-dimensional characters, especially women."

Her short story collection The Trouble With Women was reviewed by Aditya Mani Jha of Business Line, who writes that in the book, Pant "shows us how it’s done, how a skilled writer uses journalistic base to create a convincing, sensitive fictional scenario," and references her previous story collection Happy Birthday as an additional example.

Feminist Rani was praised by Kamla Bhasin as "A powerful, sensitive and thought-provoking book that is a must-read for anyone who thinks that women and men are equals, and for those who don’t."

Her story "Boonthing" was referred to as "sparkling" in a review by Abdus Salam of the anthology The Himalayan Arc: Journeys East of South-east in The Hindu, and she was described as one of the authors that 'shines through' by Prannay Pathak of the Hindustan Times.

Tanvi Trivedi of The Times of India described How To Get Published in India as "sure to answer many questions nesting in the minds of aspiring authors."

After Pant retold the epic poem The Mahabharata in one hundred tweets, Sian Cain of The Guardian wrote, "Somehow, Meghna Pant has managed to contain all of the dynamics of power struggle, war, love, lust and greed in her 140 character tidbits."

Honors and awards
 Society Achievers Award (2022) – Winner
 The Oxford Bookstore Book Cover Prize (2022) – Longlist
 FICCI Young Achiever's Award (2019) – Winner
 Laadli Media Award (2018) – Winner
 Bharat Nirman Award (2017) – Winner
 FON (Fellows of Nature) South Asia Short Story Award (2016) – Winner
 Muse India Young Writer Award (2013) – Winner
 Commonwealth Short Story Prize (2018) – Longlist
 Frank O'Connor International Short Story Award (2014) – Longlist
 The Cinnamon Press Novel Writing Award (2012) – Shortlist

Bibliography
Novels
 Boys Don't Cry (2022). Penguin Random House. .
 The Terrible, Horrible, Very Bad Good News (2021). Penguin Random House. .
 One & A Half Wife (2012). New Delhi: Westland. .

Short Stories
 Happy Birthday! (2013). London: Random House. .
 The Trouble With Women (2016).

Non-fiction
 Feminist Rani (2018). Penguin Random House. .
 How to Get Published in India (2019). Bloomsbury. .

Personal life
Born in Shimla, to Sujata and Deep Chandra Pant––both of whom worked in the Indian Revenue Service and retired as Chief Commissioners of Income Tax from Mumbai and Kolkata respectively in 2012, Pant is the sister of stand-up comedian Sorabh Pant. She lives in Mumbai with her husband and two daughters.

See also
 List of Indian writers

References

External links
 
 Meghna Pant at Penguin India

English-language writers from India
Writers from Mumbai
Indian feminist writers
Indian women journalists
Indian women short story writers
Women writers from Himachal Pradesh
Journalists from Himachal Pradesh
People from Shimla
Indian women novelists
Indian business and financial journalists
21st-century Indian women writers
21st-century Indian novelists
21st-century Indian journalists
Indian short story writers
Women business and financial journalists
Living people
Year of birth missing (living people)